The deep dorsal vein of clitoris is a vein which drains to the vesical plexus.

References

External links
 https://web.archive.org/web/20071024000415/http://anatomy.med.umich.edu/anatomytables/veins_pelvis_perineum.html

Veins of the torso
Clitoris